"Not Going Away" is the second single released from Ozzy Osbourne's 2007 album Black Rain. The single peaked at number 14 on Billboard's Hot Mainstream Rock Tracks.  The song is about Ozzy saying that he wants to perform until he is physically unable to continue, and telling all his doubters that he is "Not Going Away".

The song was performed live at the 2007 Scream Awards by Ozzy Osbourne and others, including Rob Zombie.

Personnel
Ozzy Osbourne - vocals
Zakk Wylde - guitar
Rob "Blasko" Nicholson - bass
Mike Bordin - drums

References 

2007 singles
Ozzy Osbourne songs
Songs written by Ozzy Osbourne
Songs written by Zakk Wylde
Songs written by Kevin Churko
Song recordings produced by Kevin Churko
2006 songs
Epic Records singles